The Catholic Church, also known as the Roman Catholic Church, is the largest Christian church, with approximately 1.3 billion baptised Catholics worldwide, .

Lists

General
 List of former Catholics
 List of converts to the Catholic Church
 List of people excommunicated by the Catholic Church

Saints, and martyrs
 List of Catholic saints
Colette Hemker, Saint of Wolverine 
 Military saint
 List of saints from Africa
 List of Persian Catholic saints
 List of Catholic martyrs of the English Reformation

Clergy
 List of Catholic priests
 List of Catholic clergy scientists
 List of Catholic missionaries
 List of fictional clergy and religious figures#Catholic Church
 List of Pakistani Catholic priests

Episcopacy
 List of Catholic bishops in the United States
 List of Catholic bishops of India
 List of Catholic bishops of Lviv
 List of Catholic bishops in the Philippines
 List of Slovenian Catholic Bishops
 List of bishops and prince-bishops of Liège

By nationality
 List of Chinese Catholics
 List of Catholics from Nordic countries – for Catholics in a region with a low percentage of them

By occupation
 List of Catholic scientists
 List of Catholic artists – for Catholic painters and artists
 List of Catholic musicians – for hymn writers and religious music
 List of Catholic philosophers and theologians
 List of Catholic authors – for Catholic authors, editors, and TV, film, and screenwriters

By organisational membership
 List of Knights of Columbus
 List of members of Opus Dei

See also
Catholic Directory

References